52nd meridian may refer to:

52nd meridian east, a line of longitude east of the Greenwich Meridian
52nd meridian west, a line of longitude west of the Greenwich Meridian